The Kyōka Hyaku Monogatari (狂歌百物語) is a kyōka e-hon published in 1853 (Kaei 6). As a kyōka-themed book on yōkai, and garnished with illustrations, it was edited by Rōjin Tenmei, and the illustrations were by Ryūkansai (Masasumi Ryūkansaijin).

Summary
The kyōka was extremely prosperous during the Tenmei era (1781–1789), and many kyōka e-hon garnished with colored illustrations were published. Yōkai were enjoyed as the subject of kyōka. The poet Ōta Nanpo imitated the techniques of Hyakumonogatari Kaidankai, where an event was held where he recited a kyōka that included around 100 kinds of yōkai; with the intent of doing it again, he collected together the kyōka, and the book was the result of collecting together only the better of the poems.

As a kyōka with a theme on 96 yōkai, it is divided and collected together based on each yōkai, and it recorded yōkai illustrations in various colored version of yōkai illustrations, and thus it also carries the characteristic of being an illustrated yōkai reference book. The yōkai within this book were humorous existences as the subject of kyōka, and were thus existences that were joked about, it can be seen that yōkai that were once main characters of ghost stories that were to be feared or awed became characters for amusement in the middle of the Edo period.

Koizumi Yakumo also possessed the book, and 48 poems of kyōka that he particularly liked were translated to English under the subject "Goblin Poetry". Later, Yakumo himself also garnished these notes with yōkai illustrations, and was later reproduced and published under the title "."

References

Japanese mythology
Yōkai
1853 books